Randy Scott Brown (born July 30, 1967) is an American politician who is the former mayor of Evesham Township. Brown is also a National Football League special teams coach for the Baltimore Ravens. Prior to consulting for the Baltimore Ravens, Brown served as a kicking coach for the Chicago Bears and the Philadelphia Eagles. Brown has been succeeded by Jaclyn Veasy.

Football career
Brown was named an All-State, All-County and All Conference football player at Cherokee High School before his college career at Catawba College in North Carolina. At Catawba College he was named Academic All-American and second team NAIA All-American as a place kicker. Brown was the all-time leading scorer in Catawba football history with 234 points and was the holder of 10 scoring and kicking records, many of which have been broken. Brown graduated in 1989 with a degree in journalism. In 2009, Brown was inducted to Catawba's hall of fame.

Brown and Ravens head coach John Harbaugh have been friends since the late 1990s. Since that time, Brown worked with Harbaugh for the Eagles in 2004 and 2005 and again, with the Ravens, beginning in 2008. Brown has coached in three AFC Championship games. He has coached Pro Bowl kickers Justin Tucker, Billy Cundiff and David Akers, along with Pro Bowl punters Sam Koch and Todd Sauerbrun.
Harbaugh has been quoted in the Wall Street Journal, calling Brown the "foremost kicking coach in the country".  Brown won his first Super Bowl title when the Ravens defeated the San Francisco 49ers in Super Bowl XLVII.

Political career
Brown formerly served as mayor of Evesham Township, New Jersey.
Brown was elected in 2007, re-elected in 2010 and again in 2014.  Brown announced in September 2018 that he would not seek re-election for another term.

Brown was an executive board member with the New Jersey Conference of Mayors and served on the executive board of the New Jersey League of Municipalities.

References

1967 births
Baltimore Ravens coaches
Catawba Indians football players
Cherokee High School (New Jersey) alumni
Chicago Bears coaches
Living people
Mayors of places in New Jersey
New Jersey Republicans
People from Evesham Township, New Jersey
Philadelphia Eagles coaches